Samea carettalis is a moth in the family Crambidae. It is found in Jamaica, Puerto Rico and Cuba.

References

Moths described in 1940
Spilomelinae